Abdullah Saidawi (born 4 August 1979) is a Palestinian footballer. He plays the goalkeeper position for Palestine national football team and Ramallah-based Al-Am'ary in the West Bank Premier League.

References

1979 births
Living people
Palestinian footballers
Palestine international footballers
Footballers at the 2002 Asian Games
Association football goalkeepers
Asian Games competitors for Palestine